Malvern Hanley Road railway station was a Midland Railway (MR) station on the  Malvern, Tewkesbury and Ashchurch line.

The station was opened as Malvern Wells on 1 July 1862 by the Tewkesbury and Malvern Railway before it became part of the MR.

The station was host to two LMS caravans  from 1935 to 1939.

The station was renamed Malvern Hanley Road on 2 March 1951 only to close a year later on 1 December 1952 when the line closed.

References

Notes

Citations

Further reading

 

Disused railway stations in Worcestershire
Malvern, Worcestershire
Former Midland Railway stations
Railway stations in Great Britain opened in 1862
Railway stations in Great Britain closed in 1952
1862 establishments in England